Herbert Lawford defeated Charles Walder Grinstead 7–5, 2–6, 6–2, 9–7 in the All Comers' Final, but the reigning champion William Renshaw defeated Herbert Lawford 6–0, 6–4, 9–7 in the challenge round to win the gentlemen's singles tennis title at the 1884 Wimbledon Championships. James Dwight, Arthur Rives, and Richard Sears were the first overseas players to compete at Wimbledon.

Draw

Challenge round

All comers' finals

Top half

Bottom half

References

External links

Gentlemen's Singles
Wimbledon Championship by year – Men's singles